The Cherifian Anthem, was first adopted in 1970. Composed by French military officer and chief of music for the royal Moroccan guard , it has been in use since the French protectorate period. Lyrics were written for it by Ali Squalli Houssaini and adopted in 1970.

History 

After the Moroccan national football team qualified for the 1970 World Cup in Mexico for the first time, the idea to write lyrics for the anthem was proposed. Lyrics by writer Ali Squalli Houssaini were either chosen as part of a competition by King Hassan II, or by direct commission of the King to write the lyrics.

Lyrics

Notes

References

External links 
Audio file of the "Hymne Cherifen" (.mp3)
Video file with transliteration (archive link)

African anthems
National symbols of Morocco
Moroccan songs
Royal anthems
National anthem compositions in F major
National anthem compositions in F minor
1956 songs